Choe Hyeong-min (born 15 April 1990) is a South Korean cyclist, who most recently rode for UCI Continental team .

Major results

2008
 Asian Junior Road Championships
1st  Road race
3rd  Time trial
2010
 1st  Time trial, Asian Games
 1st  Scratch, Asian Track Championships
2011
 1st  Time trial, National Road Championships
2012
 9th Road race, National Road Championships
2013
 1st  Mountains classification Tour de Korea
2014
 2nd Overall Tour de Korea
 3rd  Time trial, Asian Road Championships
2015
 3rd  Time trial, Asian Road Championships
 9th Overall Tour de Taiwan
2016
 1st  Time trial, National Road Championships
 1st  Mountains classification Tour de Korea 
 2nd  Time trial, Asian Road Championships
 9th Overall Tour de Flores 
2017
 1st  Time trial, National Road Championships
 2nd  Time trial, Asian Road Championships
2018
 1st  Time trial, National Road Championships
 1st Stage 1 Tour de Korea
 2nd  Time trial, Asian Road Championships
 4th Time trial, Asian Games
2019
 National Road Championships
1st  Time trial
4th Road race
 Asian Road Championships
2nd  Team time trial
5th Time trial
 9th Overall Tour de Korea
2020
 1st  Time trial, National Road Championships

References

External links

1990 births
Living people
South Korean male cyclists
Asian Games medalists in cycling
Cyclists at the 2010 Asian Games
Cyclists at the 2014 Asian Games
Cyclists at the 2018 Asian Games
Medalists at the 2010 Asian Games
Asian Games gold medalists for South Korea
20th-century South Korean people
21st-century South Korean people